Channighat is a village panchayat in Narsingpur Tehsil in Cachar district of Assam State, India.

The surrounding nearby villages and its distance from Channighat are Narsingpur, Bhagabazar, Chandpur, Cleverhouse, Derby, Dholai, Jamalpur, Jibangram, Kajidahar, Nagdirgram, Panibhora, Puthikhal, Rajnagar, Saptagram, and Shawrertal.

Education
 Channighat M.V School
 Dr. Br Ambedkar Memorial High School
 Bam Bidya Pith High School

College
 M A Laskar Junior College, Bhaga Bazar

Neighbourhood
 Bhaga Bazar
 Vairengte
 Lailapur
 Dholai
 Silchar

Neighbouring villages
Narsingpur 
Chandpur
Cleverhouse
Derby
Jamalpur
Jibangram
Kajidahar
Nagdirgram
Panibhora
Puthikhal
Rajnagar
Saptagram
Shawrertal

Connectivity
There is no railway station near Channighat within 35 km. However, Silchar Railway Station, a major railway station is 38 km from Channighat

References

Villages in Cachar district